POC Sports (officially POC Sweden AB), usually called simply POC, is a Swedish company that manufactures skiing and snowboarding helmets, cycling helmets, apparel, and sunglasses. POC was founded in 2005 by Stefan Ytterborn. POC has sponsored athletes Danny MacAskill, Martin Söderström, Ryder Hesjedal, Gustav Larsson, Daniel Dhers, Julia Mancuso, Bode Miller, Patrik Järbyn, Steven Nyman, Travis Ganong, Chemmy Alcott, Marco Sullivan, Fabio Wibmer.

References

Snowboarding companies
Swedish companies established in 2005

See also

•  Gen-X